Quartered Safe Out Here: A Recollection of the War in Burma is a military memoir of World War II by George MacDonald Fraser, the author of The Flashman Papers series of novels. Quartered Safe Out Here was first published in 1993.

It describes in graphic and memorable detail Fraser's experiences as a 19-year-old private in The Border Regiment, fighting with the British 14th Army against the Imperial Japanese Army, during the latter stages of the Burma Campaign in late 1944 and 1945. This included his participation in the Battle of Meiktila and Mandalay and the Battle of Pokoku and Irrawaddy River operations.

The military historian Sir John Keegan wrote: "There is no doubt that it is one of the great personal memoirs of the Second World War." Keegan gives similar praise to Norman Lewis' Naples '44 memoir, later produced as a movie. Fraser's book has also been praised by the English author Melvyn Bragg and the American playwright David Mamet.

The book's title is a quotation from Rudyard Kipling's 1890 poem "Gunga Din", and is ironic since Fraser certainly was not "quartered safe out here", while serving in Burma during one of the final campaigns of the war.

References

Military memoirs
World War II memoirs
Works by George MacDonald Fraser